Wandering As Water is Chris Brokaw's second solo album, the follow-up to 2002's Red Cities. Recorded by Paul Q. Kolderie on February 24, 2003 at Camp Street, Cambridge, Massachusetts, Wandering As Water was released in mid-2003 by Return To Sender Records in Germany. The album was released in a digipak limited edition of 2,000 copies.

Reviewing Wandering As Water, Pitchfork called it "[o]ne of the most overlooked gems of the past year [2003]", going on to assert that Brokaw's "acuity with control and complexity creates a subtle, unspoken poetry." Allmusic stated that although "[t]he acoustic set-up works very well for Brokaw's worn voice, [...] some songs he chose actually suffer from being fleshed out." 
 
"Shoot Me First", "Recidivist", and "German Song" were written and first recorded by Brokaw's previous band, Come, whilst "Embryonic Journey" was composed by Jorma Kaukonen and originally performed by Jefferson Airplane. "Ba-Di-Da" was written by American folk singer-songwriter Fred Neil.

Track listing

Personnel 
 Chris Brokaw – Acoustic Guitar, Vocals, Tambourine
 
Additional personnel 
 
 Olaf Meyer – Artwork 
 Paul Q. Kolderie – Record producer 
 David Michael Curry – Photography

References

External links 
 Allmusic, Review of Chris Brokaw's Wandering as Water 
 Pitchfork, Review of Chris Brokaw's Wandering as Water

Chris Brokaw albums
2003 albums